The Canadian Labour Union (1872 – 1878) was the short-lived first attempt at a national central organization to represent labour unions in Canada. It was founded in Toronto, Ontario on September 23, 1873, by 46 local unions. It could not be called a national body as only Ontario-based unions participated. The Union was a political organization with the aim "to agitate such questions as may be for the benefit of the working classes, in order that we may obtain the enactment of such measures by the Dominion and local legislatures as will be beneficial to us, and the repeal of all oppressive laws which now exist".

The CLU platform called for shorter hours, an end to the use of convict labour by private employers, the end of employment of children under ten years of age, immigration of ill-paid workers, a mechanics' lien act to allow workers a lien on bankrupt employers for unpaid wages, the enforcement of minimum standards of factory sanitation and ventilation, and a government bureau of statistics to provide information on wages and working conditions. It called for publicly funded education, opposition to the growing monopolies, and direct labour representation in legislatures and city governments. By no means a radical organization it urged the use of arbitration rather than strikes.

In 1873 a worldwide economic depression had a devastating effect on the fledgling Canadian labour movement. Of the 126 known unions at the start of the decade, only a few remained by the end bringing about the demise of the Canadian Labour Union.

See also
 Nine-Hour Movement
 Trades and Labour Congress of Canada

References

Sources 
 

Trade unions in Canada
Trade unions established in 1872
Defunct trade unions in Canada
Trade unions disestablished in the 1870s